Ngombale, or Ngombale Bamileke, is a Bamileke language of Cameroon.

References

Languages of Cameroon
Bamileke languages